|}

The Great St. Wilfrid Stakes is a flat handicap horse race in Great Britain open to horses aged three years or older. It is run at Ripon over a distance of 6 furlongs (1,207 metres), and it is scheduled to take place each year in August.

The event is named after St. Wilfrid, the patron saint of Ripon. The winning owner is awarded a silver trophy depicting St. Wilfrid mounted on horseback.

The Great St. Wilfrid Stakes is the venue's most valuable race of the season. It has been sponsored by William Hill since 1994.

Records
<div style="font-size:90%">
Most successful horse (2 wins):
 Pepper Lane - 2011, 2012'

Leading jockey since 1986 (3 wins):
 Daniel Tudhope - Pepper Lane (2011, 2012), Out Do (2014) Connor Beasley - Nameitwhatyoulike (2014), Dakota Gold (2019), Intrinsic Bond (2022)Leading trainer since 1986 (3 wins):

 David O'Meara - Pepper Lane (2011, 2012), Out Do (2014)</div>

Winners since 1986
 Weights given in stones and pounds.''

See also
 Horse racing in Great Britain
 List of British flat horse races

References
 Racing Post:

Flat races in Great Britain
Ripon Racecourse
Open sprint category horse races